Francisco Javier Rotunno Merino (born 2 February 1976) is a Chilean former professional footballer who played as a defender for clubs in Chile and Indonesia.

Career
Born in Chillán, Rotunno tried to join Ñublense at the age of 15, while he was a youth player of Club Deportivo Nacional. Then, he joined Coquimbo Unido youth system and made his professional debut in 1993 against Deportes La Serena, the traditional rival, at the age of 17, thanks to the coach José Sulantay. He stayed with the club until 2001, even facing the Chile national team led by Iván Zamorano and Marcelo Salas on 25 June 2000 in the Estadio Francisco Sánchez Rumoroso.

In Chile, he only played for clubs from North Zone: Deportes Antofagasta in 1998 and 2003, Cobresal in 2002, Deportes La Serena in 2003, returning to Coquimbo Unido for the 2003 Torneo Clausura.

At the end of 2003, he went to Bali, Indonesia, and joined Persekabpas Pasuruan, staying for 6 seasons. He scored only a goal in the 2005 season, but he is considered one of the most important foreign players in the Indonesian football. He also played for Sriwijaya FC.

Personal life
Rotunno made his home in Coquimbo alongside his wife, Claudia Oteíza, and his sons Paolo and Renato. Renato has been with the Coquimbo Unido youth ranks.

References

External links
 

1976 births
Living people
Chilean people of Italian descent
People from Chillán
Chilean footballers
Chilean expatriate footballers
Coquimbo Unido footballers
C.D. Antofagasta footballers
Cobresal footballers
Deportes La Serena footballers
Persekabpas Pasuruan players
Sriwijaya F.C. players
Chilean Primera División players
Primera B de Chile players
Indonesian Premier Division players
Chilean expatriate sportspeople in Indonesia
Expatriate footballers in Indonesia
Association football defenders